Harvard Crimson ice hockey may refer to either of the ice hockey teams that represent Harvard University:
Harvard Crimson men's ice hockey
Harvard Crimson women's ice hockey